La Barre is a commune in the department of Haute-Saône, in the eastern French region of Bourgogne-Franche-Comté.

Geography
Located in the valley of the Ognon river and neighboring the department of Doubs, La Barre is bordered by the municipalities of Beaumotte-Aubertans, Blarians, Germondans, Rigney and Vandelans.

Demographics

In popular culture
The fictional character Jean-Luc Picard of the American science-fiction television series Star Trek: The Next Generation was born and raised in "La Barre" on his family's vineyard there. Shots of the future La Barre are seen in the 1990 episode "Family". The location of Picard's family village was indicated as being in the Bourgogne-Franche-Comté region of France on wine bottle labels seen in the trailer for Star Trek: Picard, released on May 23, 2019.  However, as there are two La Barres in this region of France, it is not firmly established that this La Barre is Picard's home village  it could be La Barre, Jura.

See also
Municipal map of La Barre (png file)
Communes of Haute-Saône

References

External links

 La Barre at IGN

Communes of Haute-Saône